Graeme High School is a non-denominational public secondary school located in Falkirk, Scotland.  The school is operated by Falkirk Council on behalf of the Education Department of the Scottish Government. The catchment area, from which the school's pupil population is drawn, comprises Hallglen, Laurieston, St. Margaret's, Victoria and Westquarter primary schools, located in the east of Falkirk itself and in the nearby Lower Braes villages.

Admissions
The school roll contains approximately 1200 pupils, and there are almost 90 teachers on staff.

History
The school is named after Sir John de Graham, a leader in the army of William Wallace.

In 1998, it was decided by the Scottish Executive that five local schools, including Graeme High School, would be rebuilt. Graeme High was rebuilt on the playing fields east of the original school. In August 2000 the replacement school was opened by the then First Minister Donald Dewar. At the time the Public Private Partnership scheme (PFI) project that included the rebuilding of Graeme High was one of the largest in the UK.

In 2012, the school was selected as the Falkirk base for the Scottish Football Association's Performance Schools, a system devised to support the development of the best young talented footballers across the country (there are seven such schools across Scotland). As of 2018, the dedicated coach for the young players at Graeme High is Ian Ross.

Traditions
There are four houses – Lockhart (whose colour is Red), Morrison (whose colour is Yellow), Steele (whose colour is Purple) and Thomson (whose colour is Blue) – which are named after the first four rectors of the school.

Notable former pupils

 Adam Crozier, chief executive of ITV plc, and former chief executive of Royal Mail and The Football Association
 Graham Gardner, cricketer
 Malcolm Middleton, musician
 Bill Buchanan (professor) – Leading security expert and author of many academic books.
 James Redmond, broadcaster
 Tam Scobbie, footballer
 Craig Sibbald, footballer
 Ruth Connell, actress
 Gary Gillespie, footballer

References

External links
 Pictures of the original school
 Official website

Secondary schools in Falkirk (council area)
Buildings and structures in Falkirk
1937 establishments in Scotland
Educational institutions established in 1937
Youth football in Scotland